Chrysopsyche yaundae is a moth in the family Lasiocampidae. It was described by George Thomas Bethune-Baker in 1927. It is found in Cameroon.

The wingspan is about 38 mm. The forewings are very dark olive-green, with a trace of a dark subbasal transverse stripe and also a trace of a median stripe. The hindwings are dark sooty brown with paler fringes.

References

Endemic fauna of Cameroon
Moths described in 1927
Lasiocampidae